Wake Up is the second studio album from Anthony Neely. This album started pre-order on 18 January 2012 and released on 24 February. The lead single is "Awakening"，second single is "A Failed Attempt" and the third single is "Wake Up".

Tracklisting

Editions 
Pre-order
Include the track, "You Are My Baby" , music videos, film trailer and  coaster.
Standard

MVs

Chart Performances

References 

Anthony Neely albums
2012 albums